The comb-gilled catfish (Brustiarius nox) is a species of sea catfish in the family Ariidae. It was described by Albert William Herre in 1935, originally under the genus Arius. It is a tropical freshwater fish which is found in Papua New Guinea.

The comb-gilled catfish feeds on a variety of small aquatic animals, including crustaceans, worms, leeches, insects as well as larvae and nymphs, and gastropods. It also feeds on algae and detritus. Adults spawn year round, laying eggs in quantities generally ranging from 8-30, which are then orally incubated.

References

Ariidae
Taxa named by Albert William Herre
Fish described in 1935